Ivan Bušić (1745–1783), nicknamed Roša (from Italian rosso, "red", as in red-haired) was a hajduk (guerilla fighter) harambaša (commander) from the Imotski frontier (Imotska krajina, in modern Croatia), who served the Republic of Venice against the Ottomans in Dalmatia, Bosnia and Herzegovina.

Life
According to his descendant, Bruno Bušić, he was Croat, evident from the poem La trnka urekla Hrvata. He was born in Donji Vinjani around 1745. In the beginning, he was in good relation with Orthodox people, and his first harambaša was Sočivica, an Orthodox. Roša had 33 fighters, one of whom was a Muslim, Mubašir, "who was not a bad man". As a hajduk, he fought against the Ottoman Empire, traveling along Dalmatia, Bosnia and Herzegovina.

According to contemporary annals, he persecuted more Orthodox (Serbs) than Turks, because he "couldn't listen or look at them, so he killed many of them".

He was killed on April 1, 1783, by a man named Krešić, on Ilijino polje ("Ilija's Field") somewhere between Stolac and Popovo Polje.

Legacy
In 1977, Croatian dissident in emigration and Bušić clan member Bruno Bušić wrote a book Ivan Bušić-Roša, Hajdučki Harambaša, detailing the life and legend of Ivan Bušić-Roša. Today, there are many traditional folk-songs and gusle poems dedicated to Roša.

References

Further reading
Karlo Kosor: Ivan Bušić-Roša, hajdučki harambaša

Republic of Venice military personnel
Venetian period in the history of Croatia
Venetian Slavs
1745 births
1783 deaths
People from Imotski
Anti-Serbian sentiment